In algebraic topology, through an algebraic operation (dualization), there is an associated commutative algebra from the noncommutative Steenrod algebras called the dual Steenrod algebra. This dual algebra has a number of surprising benefits, such as being commutative and provided technical tools for computing the Adams spectral sequence in many cases (such as pg 61-62) with much ease.

Definition 
Recallpg 59 that the Steenrod algebra  (also denoted ) is a graded noncommutative Hopf algebra which is cocommutative, meaning its comultiplication is cocommutative. This implies if we take the dual Hopf algebra, denoted , or just , then this gives a graded-commutative algebra which has a noncommutative comultiplication. We can summarize this duality through dualizing a commutative diagram of the Steenrod's Hopf algebra structure:If we dualize we get mapsgiving the main structure maps for the dual Hopf algebra.

Case of p=2 
In this case, the dual Steenrod algebra is a graded commutative polynomial algebra  where the degree . Then, the coproduct map is given bysendingwhere .

General case of p > 2 
For all other prime numbers, the dual Steenrod algebra is slightly more complex and involves a graded-commutative exterior algebra in addition to a graded-commutative polynomial algebra.

Rest of Hopf algebra structure in both cases 
The rest of the Hopf algebra structures can be described exactly the same in both cases. There is both a unit map  and counit map which are both isomorphisms in degree : these come from the original Steenrod algebra.

See also 

 Adams-Novikov spectral sequence

References 

Algebraic topology
Hopf algebras
Homological algebra